The term of Australian parliaments is determined by the opening and dissolution (or expiration) of the House of Representatives. The Senate is not normally dissolved at all, except at a double dissolution, when the entire parliament is dissolved.

Parliaments do not have a fixed term. The maximum term permitted by section 28 of the Constitution of Australia is three years, counted from the date the parliament first meets after a general election. However, the Governor-General, acting on the advice of the Prime Minister, may dissolve the parliament earlier. This has happened in all but one case (the 3rd Parliament 1907–1910). However, the 18th Parliament (1946–49) was only five days short of the full three years, and eight parliaments have exceeded 2 years, 300 days. The average length of completed parliaments since Federation has been about 2 years, 130 days.

Because there is only an indirect relationship between the dates of elections and the commencement and dissolution dates of parliaments, more than three years can elapse between consecutive elections. This has happened on a number of occasions, most recently between the 2019 and 2022 elections (3 years 3 days). The longest gap between elections was 3 years 122 days, between the 1906 and 1910 elections.

Parliaments may be divided into one or more sessions. Each session except the last must be prorogued before a new session can begin. One of the effects of prorogation is that it prevents the Senate from meeting and conducting its business after the House of Representatives has concluded its business.

Between 1928 and 1989, the last or sole session of a parliament was not prorogued, as the parliament was dissolved. Since 1993, the session has been prorogued prior to dissolution.

Chronology

Current Parliament

Next Parliament

See also
 2019 Australian federal election

Notes

Sources
 House of Representatives Practice, Appendix 15: Chronology of Parliaments

Parliament of Australia
Federal elections in Australia